Frank Bryan may refer to:

 Frank M. Bryan, professor of political science at the University of Vermont
 Frank Bryan (cricketer) (1853–1923), English cricketer